Windeatt is a surname. Notable people with the surname include:

 Graham Windeatt (born 1954), Australian swimmer
 James Samuel Windeatt (1861–1944), English-American photographer
 Malcolm Windeatt (born 1952), British swimmer
 Nira Windeatt (née Nira Stove; born 1958), Australian swimmer, wife of Graham

English-language surnames